The Battle of Castricum (October 6, 1799) saw a Franco-Dutch force defeat an Anglo-Russian force near Castricum, Netherlands. The battle was fought during the War of the Second Coalition against Revolutionary France between French and Dutch forces under the command of General Guillaume Brune and Herman Willem Daendels and British and Russian forces under the command of the Duke of York, Sir Ralph Abercromby and the Prince of Orange.

Background 

An Anglo-Russian force of 32,000 men landed in North Holland on August 27, 1799, captured the Dutch fleet at Den Helder on August 30 and the city of Alkmaar on October 3. Following a series of battles at Bergen on September 19 and Alkmaar on October 2 (also known as 2nd Bergen), they faced the French and Dutch armies at Castricum on October 6.

Action 

The town of Castricum  passed from Batavian-French to British-Russian hands repeatedly several times until the latter finally fled, losing 2536 men and 11 guns; the Batavian-French losses stood at 1382. The defeat persuaded the Duke that his position was untenable. After a chaotic retreat, the parties signed the Convention of Alkmaar on October 10.

Aftermath 

The British and Russians were allowed to withdraw, without paying reparations, and retaining captured bounty. As a sign of gratitude for enabling him honourably to emerge from the inglorious Dutch imbroglio, Brune received a number of horses from the Duke. By 19 November all the British and Russian troops had been embarked and the expedition was over. In the years following the 1799 invasion, defensive lines were constructed in Holland to protect Amsterdam from future invasions from the north.

Commemoration 
In the Huis met de Kogel (House with the Cannonball) in Alkmaar, a cannonball that got stuck in the wall during the battle can still be seen. A plaque beneath the cannonball commemorates the battle. Various locality names in Castricum also provide a reminder of the battle, like the Russenbergen dunes and the Doodelaan street. The Russisch Monument in Bergen marks the fighting there. The French victory was also commemorated on the Arc de Triomphe in Paris as "Alkmaer".

References

External links
Anglo-Russian invasion of North Holland (1799)
Noord-Holland 1799 (in Dutch)
De Engels-Russische inval (in Dutch)

1799 in the Batavian Republic
Battles involving the Batavian Republic
Battles involving France
Battles involving Great Britain
Battles involving Russia
Battles of the French Revolutionary Wars
Battles of the Napoleonic Wars
Conflicts in 1799
Castricum
Patriottentijd
Battle of Castricum